Ritske Jelmera was a Frisian chieftain born in 1383 in Ternaard, Friesland who ruled the island of Ameland. He died in 1450 (testated January 17, 1450).

His stins (stone house) stood near Ballum. His descendants through his great-grandson Pieter went by the family name of Cammingha.

Sources and references
Burmania, Upcke van, Frisicae nobilitatis genealogia, Rijksarchief Friesland, Leeuwarden, Van Eysinga-Vegelin van Claerbergen Family Archive, inventory no. 1323b.
Verhoeven, G., J.A. Mol, and H. Bremer, Friese Testamenten tot 1550, Leeuwarden: Fryske Akademy, 1994.

1383 births
1450 deaths
Medieval West Frisians
People from Ameland
People from Dongeradeel
15th-century people of the Holy Roman Empire